The canton of Plaintel is an administrative division of the Côtes-d'Armor department, northwestern France. It was created at the French canton reorganisation which came into effect in March 2015. Its seat is in Plaintel.

It consists of the following communes:
 
Le Bodéo
Hénon
Moncontour
Plaintel
Plémy
Plœuc-l'Hermitage
Quessoy
Saint-Carreuc
Trédaniel

References

Cantons of Côtes-d'Armor